Giovanni Knapp (28 July 1943 – 21 February 2021) was an Italian racing cyclist. He won stage 4 of the 1966 Giro d'Italia. He died after suffering a fall in February 2021 at the age of 77.

References

External links
 

1943 births
2021 deaths
People from Belluno
Italian Giro d'Italia stage winners
Italian male cyclists
Cyclists from the Province of Belluno